Emil Angelescu was a Romanian bobsledder who competed in the 1930s. He won a silver medal in the four-man event at the 1934 FIBT World Championships in Garmisch-Partenkirchen.

At the 1936 Winter Olympics in Garmisch-Partenkirchen, Angelescu was listed in the four-man event, but did not compete.

References
 1936 bobsleigh four-man results
 1936 Olympic Winter Games official report. - p. 416.
 Bobsleigh four-man world championship medalists since 1930

External links

Bobsledders at the 1936 Winter Olympics
Olympic bobsledders of Romania
Possibly living people
Romanian male bobsledders
Year of birth missing